is a sub-kilometer asteroid and binary system, classified as near-Earth object of Apollo group discovered by NEAT at Palomar Observatory on 18 September 2001. It measures approximately 960 meters in diameter, while its 2001-discovered minor-planet moon has an estimated diameter of 200 meters based on a secondary to primary mean-diameter ration of 0.28.

Near-Earth asteroid 
Although  is classified as a near-Earth object, it does not pose any threats. However, the asteroid would make a good target for a spacecraft flyby, as a flyby to  would only require a delta-v of 5.4 km/s.

Moon 
 has one minor-planet moon, . It was discovered from lightcurve observations made by Czech astronomer Petr Pravec and collaborators.

References

External links 
 Lightcurve plot of (88710) 2001 SL9, Palmer Divide Observatory, B. D. Warner (2001)
 Asteroids with Satellites, Robert Johnston, johnstonsarchive.net
 Asteroid Lightcurve Database (LCDB), query form (info )
 Dictionary of Minor Planet Names, Google books
 Asteroids and comets rotation curves, CdR – Observatoire de Genève, Raoul Behrend
 Discovery Circumstances: Numbered Minor Planets (85001)-(90000) – Minor Planet Center
 
 
 

088710
088710
088710
088710
20010918